Nya Affärer was a Swedish business magazine, which was established and published by Bonnier Tidskrifter. In 2015 magazine was merged with two magazines, Veckans Affärer and Privata Affärer. The former also ended publication, and the website of Nya Affärer directs to Privata Affärer.

History and profile
Nya Affärer was first published in October 2010. The magazine was part of Bonnier Media Group and was published by Bonnier Tidskrifter. Its target audience was entrepreneurs. The magazine awarded entrepreneurs in four categories: entrepreneur of the year, new entrepreneurs, inspiring entrepreneurs and venture capitalists. Nya Affärer ceased publication and was merged into Veckans Affärer and Privata Affärer in late 2015.

References

External links
 

2010 establishments in Sweden
2015 disestablishments in Sweden
Bonnier Group
Business magazines published in Sweden
Defunct magazines published in Sweden
Magazines established in 2010
Magazines disestablished in 2015
Swedish-language magazines